Azaran (also Romanized as Āzarān, Āzerān, and Azrān; also known as Āzar) is a village in Golab Rural District, Barzok District, Kashan County, Isfahan Province, Iran. At the 2006 census, its population was 1,017, in 292 families.

References 

Populated places in Kashan County

[وبسایت رسمی دهستان گلاب روستای آذَران      azeran.ir   از وبسایت دیدن فرمایید.]
{از وبلاگ روستای آذَران نیز دیدن فرمایید.AZERAN.BLOGFA.COM}